Airtransit was a Canadian airline that provided short take-off and landing (STOL) service between Ottawa and Montreal. A subsidiary of Air Canada (then a Crown corporation), the airline operated from 1973-1976 before closing due to poor business.

History 
In 1970, the Science Council of Canada recommended that the government of Canada immediately invest in industrial development of the aviation industry, including construction of aircraft, navigation aids, and regulation of air traffic. The government began these projects shortly after the Science Council's report.

A subsidiary of Air Canada called Airtransit was founded by the government in 1973. Transport Canada developed the airline as a "pilot program" to test the feasibility of a link between the Victoria STOLport in Montreal and Ottawa/Rockcliffe Airport in Ottawa, using an eleven seat De Havilland Canada DHC-6 Twin Otter, and later the De Havilland Canada Dash 7.,,.

The service quickly ran into spending issues. Budget cuts at Air Canada, slow development of the Dash-7, noise concerns from citizens in Ottawa and Montreal, and inadequate infrastructure at Victoria STOLport forced Transport Canada to prematurely cancel the project in 1976.

Destinations

Fleet 
Originally used as bush planes, the Twin Otters used by Airtransit were modified specifically for business travellers on short distance trips.  The aircraft were equipped with oversized disc brakes and traction control as well as spoilers for the wings, a de-icing system for the propeller blades, emergency brakes, protection against engine fire, and autopilot in case of damage.

The cabin had eleven seats and fifteen windows, as well as one toilet, a cloakroom and air conditioning.

See also 
 List of defunct airlines of Canada

References 

Defunct airlines of Canada